For information on all Tarleton State University sports, see Tarleton State Texans.

The Tarleton State Texans football program, also known as the Tarleton Texans, is the intercollegiate American football team for Tarleton State University located in the U.S. state of Texas. Through the 2019 season, the team competed in NCAA Division II as members of the Lone Star Conference, but moved to the NCAA Division I Football Championship Subdivision (FCS) beginning in the 2020–21 NCAA Division I FCS football season. In fall 2021, Tarleton's full-time home of the Western Athletic Conference will revive its football league at the FCS level, with Tarleton as one of the inaugural members. However, Tarleton State is ineligible for FCS Playoff competition until 2024 due to NCAA transfer rules.  Tarleton State's first football team was fielded in 1904. The team plays its home games at the 10,000-seat Memorial Stadium in Stephenville, Texas. The Texans are coached by Todd Whitten.

History

Championships

Conference championships
† Denotes co-champions

Division championships

† Co-championship

Playoff appearances

NCAA Division II
The Texans made five appearances in the NCAA Division II playoffs. They had a combined record of 4-5.

Notable former players

Notable alumni include:

Richard Bartel, QB: Dallas Cowboys, Cleveland Browns, Jacksonville Jaguars, Washington Redskins, Sacramento Mountain Lions, Arizona Cardinals. 2007-2012. Offensive coordinator: Atlanta Legends. 2019.

Marv Brown, HB: Detroit Lions. 1957.

Walter Bryan, DB: Baltimore Colts. 1955.

James Dearth, LS: Cleveland Browns, New York Jets, Washington Redskins, San Diego Chargers, New England Patriots. 1999-2011.

Saalim Hakim, WR: New Orleans Saints, New York Jets, Kansas City Chiefs. 2012-2015.

Rufus Johnson, DE: New Orleans Saints, New England Patriots, Washington Redskins, Oakland Raiders. 2013-2017.

Garrett Lindholm, K: Atlanta Falcons, Indianapolis Colts, Milwaukee Mustangs, St. Louis Rams, Arizona Rattlers, San Antonio Talons, New Orleans VooDoo, Orlando Predators, Los Angeles KISS. 2010-2016.

Tywain Myles, DT: Jacksonville Jaguars, Atlanta Falcons. 2008-2009.

Deshaun Phillips, CB: Dallas Cowboys, New York Jets, Washington Redskins, Pittsburgh Steelers, Dallas Renegades. 2014–Present.

Derrick Ross, FB: Kansas City Chiefs, Cologne Centurions, Montreal Alouettes, Winnipeg Blue Bombers, San Angelo Stampede Express, Dallas Vigilantes, Philadelphia Soul, Los Angeles KISS, Las Vegas Outlaws, Jacksonville Sharks. 2006-2017.

E.J. Speed, LB: Indianapolis Colts. 2019–Present.

Nick Stephens, QB: Tennessee Titans, Utah Blaze, Dallas Cowboys, Baltimore Ravens, San Jose SaberCats. 2012-2014.

Camp Wilson, FB: Detroit Lions. 1946-1949.

Randy Winkler, OT: Detroit Lions, Atlanta Falcons, Green Bay Packers. 1968-1971.

Koe Wetzel, LB: American singer/songwriter

Future non-conference opponents 
Announced schedules as of November 28, 2022.

Notes

References

External links
 

 
American football teams established in 1904
1904 establishments in Texas